Robert L. Davis (February 13, 1908 – January 10, 1965) was an American football coach.  He served as the head football coach at Colorado State College of Agriculture and Mechanic Arts—now known as Colorado State University—from 1947 to 1955. Davis was born and raised in Salt Lake City, Utah and played his collegiate football at the University of Utah under Ike Armstrong. Quarterback and team captain in 1929, Davis lead Utah to the conference championship, graduating in 1930. He coached at South Salt Lake City High School, Weber Junior College, and was an assistant coach at the University of Utah and the University of Denver before being named as the head coach of football at Colorado A&M College on January 6, 1947.

Davis utilized the T formation and veterans returning from World War II to turn around a 2–7 Aggies team in 1946 to an 8–2 team in 1948; placing second in the Skyline Conference. Upon turning the Aggies around in 1948, Colorado A&M was invited to and played in the 1949 Raisin Bowl in Fresno, California against Occidental. Only losing 21–20 in the last minutes of the game, Davis' 1949 team went on to a 9–1 record and placed second again. Davis was a revolutionary coach utilizing classroom football along with practice and game films to help his players excel. Davis also played black athletes, such as Eddie Hanna, George Jones and Alex Burl,  in a predominantly white school.

Several of Davis' players went on to play in the National Football League (NFL), including Dale Dodrill, Thurman "Fum" McGraw, Jim David, Don Burroughs, Jack Christiansen, Alex Burl and Gary Glick. Three of his players were All-Americans; Thurman "Fum" Mcgraw (first team 1948, 1949), Harvey Achziger (first team 1952) and Gary Glick (second team 1955). Davis' 1955 team won the Skyline Conference championship, but following the season he resigned from coaching football to concentrate on his duties as athletic director, a post he had held since 1953. His departure began a four-decade downturn in the Rams' fortunes; he was the last coach to leave Fort Collins with a winning record until Sonny Lubick's tenure.

Davis continued as athletic director when Colorado A&M became Colorado State University in 1957 and is responsible for paving the way to construct Moby Arena and Hughes Stadium during the campus' rebirth. Davis died while serving as athletic director on January 10, 1965, following a lengthy illness.

Head coaching record

References

1908 births
1965 deaths
Colorado State Rams athletic directors
Colorado State Rams football coaches
Denver Pioneers football coaches
Utah Utes football players
Utah Utes football coaches
High school football coaches in Utah
Junior college football coaches in the United States
Sportspeople from Salt Lake City
Players of American football from Salt Lake City